Graovac is a Serbo-Croatian surname, derived from the toponym Graovo. Notable people with the surname include:

Ante Graovac (1945–2012), Croatian scientist 
Daniel Graovac (born 1993), Bosnian footballer
Kristina Graovac (born 1991), Serbian handballer
Tyler Graovac (born 1993), Canadian ice hockey player

See also
Grahovac

Bosnian surnames
Croatian surnames
Serbian surnames